Penns Cave Airport  is an airport located next to Penn's Cave near Centre Hall, Pennsylvania. It is open for visitors to the Penn's Cave attraction.

See also 
 List of airports in Pennsylvania

References

External links 

Airports in Pennsylvania